Bob Ross (1942–1995) was an American painter and television presenter.

Bob Ross may also refer to:
Bob Ross (publisher) (1934–2003), American publisher/activist
Bob Ross (baseball) (born 1928), American pitcher
Bob Ross (Australian footballer) (1908–1988), Australian rules footballer
Bob Ross (footballer, born 1901), Scottish footballer

See also
Robert Ross (disambiguation)
Bobby Ross (disambiguation)
Bob Roth, Transcendental Meditation teacher and author